The Italian Numismatic Institute (Istituto italiano di numismatica) is an Italian body for the study of numismatics, based in Palazzo Barberini at 13 via Quattro Fontane.

History
It was founded in Rome in 1912 as a private association by a group of Italian numismatists, including Secondina Lorenza Cesano, an academic at Rome University. Initially a voluntary association under private law, it acquired public law judicial status under the royal decree (RDL) number 223 of 3 February 1936. It thus joined the Italian Numismatic Society founded in the 19th century.

Partnership and membership
It is a founder member of the Centro Internazionale di Studi Numismatici, based in Naples, created in 1965 as a result of a joint initiative by the International Numismatic Council and the Museo Civico Filangieri, a private museum in Naples. It also collaborates with other international bodies such as the International Numismatic Council, the Rome-based Unione internazionale degli istituti di archeologia and the American Numismatic Society.

Governance
It is governed by a 'Consiglio direttivo' or directorial committee, made up "of presidents of the four national historical Institutes, the president of the National Institute for Archaeology and Art History, and two experts nominated by decree by the Ministry of Cultural Heritage and Activities". Since 2011 the president of the 'consiglio' has been Sara Sorda, whose predecessor Attilio Stazio died in 2010. Its current members are Andrea Giardina, Adriano La Regina, Luigi Lotti, Massimo Miglio, Nicola Parise, Sara Sorda and Romano Ugolini. Past members of the 'Consiglio' include Edoardo Martinori, once its vice-president.

Presidents
Since 1936 its presidents have been:
 Amedeo Maiuri (from 1936).
 Cesare Maria De Vecchi, conte di Val Cismon (from 1939).
 Secondina Lorenza Cesano (acting president, from 1943).
 Gaetano De Sanctis (extraordinary commissar, from 1944).
 Francesco Pellati (governing commisar, from 1952).
 Aldo Ferrabino (governing commisar, from 1958).
 Laura Breglia (1962-1991).
 Attilio Stazio (from 1991)
 Sara Sorda (from 2010)

Publications and library and multimedia resources

Conferences
Since 1961 it has organised:
 1961: VI Congresso Internazionale di Numismatica
 1978: «Le forme e i modi della scambio e le espressioni del valore nel Mediterraneo Orientale, tra la tarda età del Bronzo e gli inizi della monetazione»
 1982: «Stato e moneta a Roma fra la tarda repubblica e il primo impero»
 1983: «Aspetti della società romana fra la metà del IV e la metà del III secolo a.C.: documentazioni a confronto»
 1986: «La moneta nei contesti archeologici: esempi dagli scavi di Roma»
 1988: «L'inflazione nel IV secolo d.C.»
 1995: «Bernhard Laum. Origine della moneta e teoria del sacrificio»
 1997: «Metodi statistici e analisi quantitative della produzione di monete nel mondo antico. Tendenze e prospettive di ricerca»
 1997: «La storia mutilata: la dispersione dei rinvenimenti monetali in Italia»
 2000: «La moneta in ambiente rurale nell'Italia tardomedievale»
 2001: «Per una storia del denaro nel Vicino Oriente antico»
 2004: «Dal Denarius al Dinar: l'Oriente e la moneta romana»
 2004: «Weights in Context. Bronze Age Weighing of Eastern Mediterranean: Chronology, Typology, Material and Archaeological Contexts»
 2008: «Quantifying Monetary Supplies in Greco-Roman Times»

References

Bibliography (in Italian) 
 Giovanni Gorini, Cento anni della Rivista italiana di numismatica, in Rivista italiana di numismatica, XC, 1988
 Istituto Italiano di Numismatica (official site)
 Annuario n. 49 dell'Unione Internazionale degli Istituti di Archeologia Storia e Storia dell'Arte in Roma, pp. 327–330

Numismatic associations
Publishing companies of Italy
1912 establishments in Italy
Organisations based in Rome